Wasim Ali (born 8 June 1969) is a Pakistani former cricketer. He played 63 first-class matches in Pakistan between 1985 and 1994. He was also part of Pakistan's squad for the 1988 Youth Cricket World Cup.

References

External links
 

1969 births
Living people
Pakistani cricketers
House Building Finance Corporation cricketers
Lahore cricketers
Cricketers from Lahore